Frank Fleming (15 March 1907 – 29 December 1963) was an  Australian rules footballer who played with Fitzroy in the Victorian Football League (VFL).

External links 		
		

1907 births
1963 deaths
Australian rules footballers from Victoria (Australia)
Fitzroy Football Club players